Cultures et Conflits is an international relations journal associated with the Paris School of security studies.

References

Security studies
International relations journals
French-language journals